Mina El Hammani (born 29 November 1993) is a Spanish actress, model and film director best known for her role of 'Nadia' in the streaming television series Élite.

Early life
Mina El Hammani was born and raised in Madrid, Spain. Her family is of Moroccan origin. She began her acting career in 2014.

Filmography

TV Series 
 Centro médico as Amina (2015)
El Príncipe as Nur (2015–2016)
 La que se avecina as Fátima (2016)The State as girl of the magazine (2017)Servir y proteger as Salima Ben Ahmed (2017–2018)Élite as Nadia Shanaa (2018–2021)
 Hernán as Aisha (2019)
 El internado: Las Cumbres as Elvira (2021–present)
 Historias para no dormir'' (TBA)

References

External links
 

1993 births
Living people
Spanish people of Moroccan descent
21st-century Spanish actresses
Actresses from Madrid
Spanish television actresses
Web series actresses